Carioca Arena 3 (Portuguese: Arena Carioca 3) is an indoor stadium in Barra da Tijuca in the west zone of Rio de Janeiro, Brazil. The venue hosted taekwondo and fencing competitions at the 2016 Summer Olympics and the judo and wheelchair fencing competitions at the 2016 Summer Paralympics. Carioca Arena 3 was planned to be transformed into a sports high school after the Games.

During the COVID-19 pandemic in Brazil, the structure of Carioca Arena 3 was used as a base for the health workers on vaccination programme. As of February 2022, the Arena is open for children engaged in sports activities promoted by the prefecture of Rio de Janeiro.

See also
 Carioca Arena 1
 Carioca Arena 2

References

Indoor arenas in Brazil
Sports venues in Rio de Janeiro (city)
Barra Olympic Park
Olympic taekwondo venues
Sports venues completed in 2016
Olympic fencing venues
2016 establishments in Brazil